is a Japanese manga series created by Clamp. The manga was published in Japan by Kadokawa Shoten, and in English originally by Tokyopop, but has since been re-licensed by Dark Horse Comics. It was the group's first work using a significantly pared down style, which lowered emphasis on detail and accentuated posing and gestures. It would later be repeated in series like Chobits and Tsubasa: Reservoir Chronicle.

The manga was adapted into a 26-episode anime series produced by Bones titled  which aired on TV Tokyo from April 1, 2001 – September 23, 2001. Seven volumes of videos were released by ADV Films on VHS and DVD in 2003. It was re-released in 2005 as a five volume box set. North American publisher Dark Horse Comics re-releases Angelic Layer in omnibus format in 2011. Sentai Filmworks will re-release the series under their Sentai Selects label on November 24, 2015. Anime Limited announced they would release the series in the UK in 2018.

Angelic Layer takes place in the same universe as Clamp's later work Chobits, which similarly deals with the relationship between humans, human-created devices, toys, and godlike power. Several characters also appear in Clamp's Tsubasa: Reservoir Chronicle including most of the main characters, as well as the angel Blanche.

Plot

The primary protagonist is Misaki Suzuhara. Despite her short appearance she is a seventh grader who just moved to Tokyo to live with her aunt, Shouko Asami. After arriving in the city outside of Tokyo Station, Misaki watches a battle between two dolls on a big live-screen called Angelic Layer, a highly popular game in which players (called Deus) buy and custom-design dolls known as Angels that are moved by mental control when on a field called the "layer."

Interested in learning about Angelic Layer, an eccentric man wearing a white lab coat and glasses, calling himself "Icchan" (いっちゃん), encourages Misaki to purchase and create her own angel. She wants the angel to be "a short girl, but strong and happy", and names it Hikaru, based on Hikaru Shidō from Clamp's Magic Knight Rayearth (a [[Story within a story|manga in Angelic Layers world]]). Even though she's clueless about the game, Misaki soon competes in tournaments and is assisted and watched carefully by Icchan. Later, Icchan's identity is revealed as Ichiro Mihara, the co-creator of Angelic Layer.

Misaki begins studying at the Eriol Academy, an educational institution which include grades from kindergarten through high school. There she becomes friends with Hatoko Kobayashi, a very intelligent and mature kindergarten girl who is a famous Deus and an Angelic Layer expert. Her incredibly fast angel Suzuka is a favourite contender in tournaments. Misaki also befriends Hatoko's older brother Kōtarō and his friend Tamayo Kizaki, a girl fascinated by martial arts. Both turn out to be Misaki's classmates.

While adjusting to her new surroundings, Misaki is also gripped by her past. Her thoughts often dwell on her mother, whom she has not seen since pre-school. Eventually, Misaki learns that her mother was key in the development of Angelic Layer, which she worked on in an attempt to develop a perfect prosthesis for her multiple sclerosis, which has confined her to a wheelchair. Her mother is also the Deus of Athena and the champion of Angelic Layer.

The differences in the anime series: Misaki names her angel of her favorite doll from childhood. The ending to the manga also has different couplings. In the manga, Misaki's mother does not have multiple sclerosis. Icchan plays an important role in the Chobits storyline, but this connection was reduced to a single scene in the anime; the Chobits anime was also made by a different company. Kaede's younger brother Minoru is also a Chobits character.

Media

Manga

Anime

MusicOpening Theme:"Be My Angel"
Lyrics by: Goro Matsui
Composition by: Takahiro Ando, Goro Matsui
Arrangement by: Takahiro Ando
Song by: Atsuko EnomotoEnding Theme:'''
"The Starry Sky" (☆the starry sky☆)
Lyrics by: HALNA
Composition by: Atsushi Sato
Arrangement by: HAL
Song by: HAL

Lyrics by: Chisa Tanabe
Composition by: Kazuhiro Hara
Arrangement by: Takao Kōnishi
Song by: Moeko Matsushita

All of the background musical scores was composed, arranged and conducted by Kōhei Tanaka.

ReceptionAngelic Layer won the Animation Kobe Award for TV Feature in 2001. Jason Bustard of THEM Anime Reviews gave Angelic Layer a 5-star rating, noting that the character designs were well presented and the animation was colourful, also that Angelic Layer'' portrayed the concepts of friendship and how "through common interests, even very different people can be friends". Zac Bertschy of Anime News Network however, was less kind, comparing it to Pokémon and Digimon, and calling it a glorified tie-in to "a toy you can't purchase".

References

External links
Tokyopop page
Bones page
ADV Films page
Madman Entertainment page
Sentai Filmworks page
Angelic Layer (manga) at BookWalker

1999 manga
2001 anime television series debuts
ADV Films
Adventure anime and manga
Anime series based on manga
Bones (studio)
Brain–computer interfacing in fiction
Comedy anime and manga
Dark Horse Comics titles
Disability in fiction
Fictional martial sports in anime and manga
Kadokawa Shoten manga
Kadokawa Dwango franchises
Manga adapted into television series
Robot comics
Science fiction anime and manga
Sentai Filmworks
Shōnen manga
Television shows written by Ichirō Ōkouchi
Tokyopop titles
TV Tokyo original programming
Works by Clamp (manga artists)